Yocona River is a stream in the U.S. state of Mississippi. It is a tributary of the Tallahatchie River.

The fish species Etheostoma faulkneri (Yoknapatawpha darter) is endemic to headwater streams of the Yocona River watershed, being found nowhere else in the world.

In Yalobusha County, the river is impounded by an earthen dam, near the community of Enid, creating Enid Lake, with that lake's waters stretching as far as the town of Water Valley.

Name
Yocona is a name derived from the Chickasaw language meaning "land".

The Board on Geographic Names settled on "Yocona River" as the river's official name and spelling in 1912.  According to the Geographic Names Information System, the Yocona River has also been known as:

Yackoney River
Yacony Creek
Yanekney River
Yocana River
Yocany River
Yoccona River
Yochnapafa Creek
Yockany River
Yockhapatalfa River
Yockinapatapha River
Yockna River
Yockney River
Yocona River Canal
Yoconie River
Yohnapatapna River
Yokoney River

The Yocona River was referred to as the Yoknapatawpha River by William Faulkner.

References

Rivers of Mississippi
Rivers of Tallahatchie County, Mississippi
Rivers of Panola County, Mississippi
Rivers of Yalobusha County, Mississippi
Rivers of Lafayette County, Mississippi
Rivers of Pontotoc County, Mississippi
Mississippi placenames of Native American origin